Mordechai Shani is an Israeli physician. He is Professor of Healthcare Systems at Tel Aviv University. He served as the Director General of the Sheba Medical Center. He was the recipient of the Israel Prize in 2009.

Biography
Mordechai Shani received an M.D. from the Hadassah Medical School at the Hebrew University of Jerusalem.

Medical and academic career
He has served as the Director General of the Sheba Medical Center for thirty-three years. He also helped found the School for Health Policy at Tel Aviv University in 2005, and served as its Head until 2009. He served as the Director of the Israeli Ministry of Health in 1979 and again from 1993 to 1994. He was instrumental in the passing of a national healthcare insurance policy for Israeli citizens.

He is Professor of Healthcare Systems at Tel Aviv University. He is also the Founder and Chairman of the Management Committee of the Gertner Institute for Epidemiology and Health Policy Research.

Awards and recognition
In 2009, he was awarded the Israel Prize from the State of Israel for 'Lifetime Achievement.' The prize was met with controversy, as an advocacy group accused Shani of working for a private corporation in Hungary, which he denied.

References

Living people
The Hebrew University-Hadassah Medical School alumni
20th-century Israeli physicians
Academic staff of Tel Aviv University
Israel Prize for lifetime achievement & special contribution to society recipients
Israeli healthcare managers
Year of birth missing (living people)